Conus tostesi is a species of sea snail, a marine gastropod mollusk in the family Conidae, the cone snails, cone shells or cones.

These snails are predatory and venomous. They are capable of "stinging" humans.

Description
The size of the shell varies between 22 mm and 40 mm.

Distribution
This marine species occurs off Brasil.

References

 Tucker J.K. & Tenorio M.J. (2013) Illustrated catalog of the living cone shells. 517 pp. Wellington, Florida: MdM Publishing.

External links
 To World Register of Marine Species
 Cone Shells - Knights of the Sea
 Gastropods.com: Lamniconus clerii  var. tostesi

tostesi
Gastropods described in 1986